Chasen Dean Shreve (born July 12, 1990) is an American professional baseball pitcher in the Detroit Tigers organization. He made his MLB debut in 2014 with the Atlanta Braves and he has also played in MLB for the New York Yankees, St. Louis Cardinals, Pittsburgh Pirates, and New York Mets.

Career

Amateur career
Shreve attended Bonanza High School in Las Vegas, Nevada. In his senior year, Shreve was named to the Nevada All-State Second team for baseball. He enrolled at the College of Southern Nevada, where he played college baseball.

Atlanta Braves
The Atlanta Braves selected Shreve in the 11th round of the 2010 Major League Baseball Draft. He made his professional debut with the Danville Braves of the Rookie-level Appalachian League that year, pitching to a 2–0 win–loss record and a 2.25 earned run average (ERA). In 2011, Shreve pitched for the Rome Braves of the Class A South Atlantic League, finishing the season with a 5–6 win–loss record and a 3.86 ERA.

Shreve began the 2012 season with the Lynchburg Hillcats of the Class A-Advanced Carolina League, where he had a 4–4 win–loss record and a 2.15 ERA, before receiving a promotion to the Mississippi Braves of the Class AA Southern League, where he had a 2–1 record and a 3.93 ERA. Shreve split the 2013 season with Mississippi and Lynchburg, pitching to a 3–1 record and a 4.43 ERA in Mississippi and a 0–1 record and a 2.75 ERA with Lynchburg.

During spring training in 2014, Shreve altered his approach to increase his pitching velocity. He had a 3–2 with seven saves and a 2.48 ERA. The Braves promoted Shreve to the major leagues for the first time on July 19, 2014 to replace Luis Avilán. The Braves demoted Shreve to the Gwinnett Braves of the Class AAA International League on August 1. He made 15 appearances for the Braves in 2014 accumulating a 0.73 ERA.

New York Yankees
The Braves traded Shreve and David Carpenter to the New York Yankees for Manny Banuelos on January 1, 2015.

Shreve pitched to a 1.89 ERA in his first  innings of the 2015 season, but had a 13.50 ERA in his final six innings, during which he allowed four home runs. Yankees catcher Brian McCann speculated that Shreve was tipping his pitches to opposing hitters, though Larry Rothschild, the Yankees pitching coach, believed Shreve was simply tired at the end of the season. Overall in 2015, Shreve ended the season 6–2 with a 3.09 ERA in 59 game appearances.

Shreve struggled to a 5.21 ERA in his first 19 appearances to begin 2016. On May 26, 2016, he was placed on the 15-day disabled list due to a left shoulder strain. On August 30, Shreve earned his first Major League save in 5–4 ten-inning win over the Kansas City Royals. In 2017, Shreve spent the first half of the season between AAA and the Yankees bullpen. Through his first 29 appearances, he collected a 2.77 ERA before being sent back down to Class AAA on July 19 after the acquisition of David Robertson and Tommy Kahnle. The Yankees recalled Shreve on July 30.

St. Louis Cardinals
On July 27, 2018, the Yankees traded Shreve and Giovanny Gallegos to the St. Louis Cardinals for Luke Voit and bonus pool money. In 39 games for the Yankees, he had compiled a 2–2 record with a 4.26 ERA.

Shreve finished his 2018 campaign in St. Louis with a 1–2 record and a 3.07 ERA in 20 relief appearances. On March 22, 2019, Shreve was designated for assignment by the team. He was outrighted on March 27 and assigned to the Memphis Redbirds of the Class AAA Pacific Coast League. He was recalled to St. Louis for the first time in 2019 on July 11, but designated for assignment once again on July 23. Shreve elected free agency on October 1, 2019.

New York Mets
On November 21, 2019, Shreve signed a minor league contract with the New York Mets. During the shortened 2020 season, Shreve appeared in 17 games for the Mets and recorded a 3.96 ERA and 34 strikeouts in 25 innings. On December 2, 2020, Shreve was non tendered by the Mets.

Pittsburgh Pirates
On February 7, 2021, Shreve signed a minor league contract with the Pittsburgh Pirates organization. On May 11, 2021, Shreve was selected to the active roster. Shreve pitched to a 3.20 ERA in 57 appearances out of the bullpen for Pittsburgh. On November 6, Shreve was outrighted off of the 40-man roster and elected free agency.

New York Mets (Second stint)
On November 17, 2021, Shreve signed a minor league deal with the New York Mets. On April 4, 2022, Shreve had his contract selected to the big league roster. On July 5, the Mets designated Shreve for assignment. On July 8, Shreve was released by the Mets.

New York Yankees (second stint)
On August 28, 2022, Shreve signed a minor league deal with the New York Yankees. He elected free agency on November 10, 2022.

Detroit Tigers
On January 9, 2023, Shreve signed a minor league contract with the Detroit Tigers organization.

References

External links

1990 births
Living people
Sportspeople from the Las Vegas Valley
Baseball players from Nevada
Major League Baseball pitchers
Atlanta Braves players
New York Yankees players
St. Louis Cardinals players
New York Mets players
Pittsburgh Pirates players
Southern Nevada Coyotes baseball players
Danville Braves players
Rome Braves players
Lynchburg Hillcats players
Mississippi Braves players
Gwinnett Braves players
Scranton/Wilkes-Barre RailRiders players
Memphis Redbirds players
Indianapolis Indians players